The women's 200 metre breaststroke event at the 2022 Commonwealth Games was held on 31 July at the Sandwell Aquatics Centre.

Records 
Prior to this competition, the existing world, Commonwealth and Games records were as follows:

Schedule 
The schedule is as follows:

All times are British Summer Time (UTC+1)

Results

Heats

Final

References

Women's 200 metre breaststroke
Commonwealth Games